The Jesse Owens Award (also the Jackie Joyner-Kersee Award for the female version of the award) is an annual track and field award that is the highest accolade given out by USA Track & Field (USATF).  As the country's highest award for the sport, it bears Jesse Owens's name in recognition of his significant career, which included four gold medals at the 1936 Olympic Games. First awarded in 1981 to hurdler Edwin Moses, it was created to recognize the season's top American performer in track and field competitions. In 1996, the award was divided into two categories, with both a male and female winner. The 1996 winners, Michael Johnson and Gail Devers, each won two gold medals at that year's Olympics in Atlanta.  Up until 2008, the award was voted on by members of the United States athletics media only, but in 2009 fans were able to vote via the USATF website, with their opinions contributing 10% of the overall result.

The winners of the award are typically announced in late November or early December after the end of the outdoor track and field season. A number of athletes have received the award on more than one occasion: Jackie Joyner-Kersee was the first to do so with back-to-back wins in 1986 and 1987, while Carl Lewis won his second award in 1991. Michael Johnson was the first to receive the award three times (winning consecutively from 1994–1996) and Marion Jones became the first woman to collect three awards after wins in 1997, 1998 and 2002. In 2012, Allyson Felix won the award for the fourth time, thus distinguishing herself as the athlete with the most wins. Winners receive a replica of the award while the original remains on permanent display at the USATF Headquarters in Indianapolis, Indiana. As of 2013, the female version of the award was renamed the Jackie Joyner-Kersee Athlete of the Year Award.

List of recipients

References
General

Specific

External links
Official USATF website
Official Jesse Owens website

Sport of athletics awards
American sports trophies and awards
Most valuable player awards
Awards established in 1981
1981 establishments in the United States
Jesse Owens